A list of films produced in Occupied France in 1943.

See also
 1943 in France

References

External links
 French films of 1943 at the Internet Movie Database
French films of 1943 at Cinema-francais.fr

1943
Films
French